Pac-Man and the Ghostly Adventures, also known in Japan as  is a 3D platform video game based on the TV series of the same name which aired on Disney XD from 2013 to 2015. It was released for the Xbox 360, Windows, PlayStation 3, and Wii U in October 2013, and was later released for the Nintendo 3DS in November of that year. The console and PC versions were developed by Monkey Bar Games and the 3DS version was developed by Inti Creates. Both versions were published by Namco Bandai Games.

On March 1, 2014, Bandai Namco announced a sequel called Pac-Man and the Ghostly Adventures 2.

The game, along with Pac-Man and the Ghostly Adventures 2 and Pac-Man Museum were delisted from retailers in July 2020.

Plot
The game begins with Pac-Man and his friends walk into Sir Cumference's lab. Three golden orbs are on a table, and while Sir C is explaining what they are to Pac-Man, four ghosts from the netherworld (Blinky, Inky, Pinky and Clyde) come and tell Pac-Man that Pacopolis is under attack by the forces of Betrayus, king of the netherworld. They do so to steal the Frigidigitator, a device Sir C made for when Betrayus would make another heat-wave device like the one from Season 1's "Betrayus Turns the Heat Up".

Reception

Pac-Man and the Ghostly Adventures received mixed reviews. Nintendo Life gave 7.0/10, writing "Pac-Man's latest adventure is kid-friendly in the best way: this is a solid, enjoyable 3D platformer that's built with a level of care and polish not often seen in games aimed at this audience."

GameZone's David Sanchez gave Pac-Man and the Ghostly Adventures a 4.5/10, writing that "Ghostly Adventures looks okay — it's certainly nicer to look at than it is to play, that's for sure."

Notes

References

External links
 

2013 video games
Bandai Namco games
Pac-Man
Namco games
Inti Creates games
Windows games
Nintendo 3DS games
Nintendo 3DS eShop games
Wii U games
Wii U eShop games
PlayStation 3 games
Xbox 360 games
Video games developed in Japan
Video games developed in the United States
Video games scored by Ippo Yamada
3D platform games
Multiplayer and single-player video games
Split-screen multiplayer games
Platform games
Video games about size change
Video games based on animated television series
Monkey Bar Games games